A Yakult lady (ヤクルトレディー; Yakuruto redi-), also known as an Yakult auntie (ヤクルトおばさん; Yakuruto obasan), is a woman who sells Yakult products as an employee or delivers the products door to door to individuals at their homes. In order to promote good health, they sell and market Yakult products while riding bicycles, motorcycles, or other automobiles. They wear the company's uniform, including a hat and a pair of gloves. Men such as Kazuhisa Ishii have also worked as Yakult "ladies". The Yakult lady home delivery system was introduced in 1963 while the Yakult Lady System started in 1981.

There have been many cases in which a Yakult lady's social standing has become more like that of an entrepreneur than that of a part-time worker. They are fairly similar to retail stores licensed to sell the products by Yakult themselves. Yakult is sold in 31 countries around the world, but Yakult ladies only sell and distribute in Asian countries such as China, India, the Philippines and  Indonesia as well as Central and South American countries such as Brazil.

Although Yakult is sold in Western countries, Yakult ladies do not operate there. A trial of the system was introduced to Australia in 1994 but it was eventually disbanded.

See also 

 Milk delivery
 Dabbawala

References

External links
  堅調ヤクルトレディー　地域密着、不況知らず

Personal selling
Distribution (marketing)
Economy of Japan
1963 introductions